Melissa Mantak (born 1962) is a triathlete and triathlon coach from the United States. In 2010 she was named USA Triathlon's National Coach of the Year.

Biography 
Mantak completed a master's degree in sport sciences at the University of Denver. She completed her first triathlon in 1984, while at university. She competed professionally as a triathlete then in 2006 started her own coaching business. In 2007 she was appointed head coach to the United States triathlon team for International Triathlon Union World Cup races.

References

1962 births
Living people
Triathlon coaches